Giulești Park is a future park in north-west of Bucharest, Romania, with the center to the ruins of Chiajna Monastery.

Parks in Bucharest